Syafiq Ridhwan Abdul Malik is a Malaysian ten-pin bowler. He was born on 29 November 1986 in Federal Territories (Malaysia). He bowls right handed with a 15lbs ball.

Career

During 2012 QubicaAMF Bowling World Cup
event, he became the first Malaysian to win the world cup.

References

Malaysian ten-pin bowling players
Asian Games medalists in bowling
Bowlers at the 2010 Asian Games
Bowlers at the 2014 Asian Games
Bowlers at the 2018 Asian Games
Asian Games silver medalists for Malaysia
Medalists at the 2010 Asian Games
Medalists at the 2014 Asian Games
1986 births
Living people
Southeast Asian Games gold medalists for Malaysia
Southeast Asian Games silver medalists for Malaysia
Southeast Asian Games bronze medalists for Malaysia
Southeast Asian Games medalists in bowling
Competitors at the 2007 Southeast Asian Games
Competitors at the 2011 Southeast Asian Games